Inter-County Highways in Minnesota are roads locally maintained by county highway departments in Minnesota. Though the majority of these Inter-County Highways travel concurrently with other County roads in Minnesota, some travel concurrently with other highways in the state. Unlike most county roads in Minnesota that are designated with numbers that are unique only within a county, Inter-County Highways are designated with a letter, but this system is not shown on most maps. However, as these highways provide important alternate routes to the state highway system, the Minnesota Department of Transportation have recommended a local route numbering / labeling system that clearly identifies county routes that are continuous into neighboring counties. These routes, if marked, are marked with either a white square shield or a blue pentagon shield, with a blue square shield containing the route letter directly under shield with the route number.

Route list
 Inter-County A (Todd County and Wadena County): Stearns-Todd county line on CR 11 north of Sauk Centre, north through Clarissa to Aldrich, northwest to Verndale, and north via Blue Grass, to Wadena–Hubbard County line, northeast of Menahga.
 Inter-County B (Crow Wing and Cass County): MN 238 at Elmdale north via Randall, Pillager,  Pine River, and Bena to Cass–Itasca County line, northeast of Bena
 Inter-County C (Morrison County and Crow Wing): MN 27 east of Little Falls north via Brainerd to CR 1/Inter-County D west of Emily
 Inter-County D (Wadena County, Cass County and Crow Wing County): Otter Tail–Wadena County west of Sebeka east via Nimrod, Pine River to Aitkin County line east of Emily
 Inter-County E (Douglas County, Todd County, and Morrison County): MN 29 west of Miltona east via Browerville and Randall to MN 27 west of Onamia
 Inter-County F (Todd County and Morrison County): CR 51 at the Douglas-Todd county line in Osakis, CR 2 and CR 19 to Upsala, CR 21, CR 24 through Bowlus, CR 26 through Royalton, Little Rock, Morrill, and Ramey, CR 33, and CR 32 to the Morrison–Mille Lacs county line, between Lakin and Page townships.   
 Inter-County G (Isanti County): Mille Lacs County line northeast of Princeton east via Dalbo to MN 65 west of Stanchfield
 
 
 Inter-County J (Mille Lacs County): US 169 south of Onamia east to CR 24 northwest of Mora

Former Routes
 Inter-County H (Isanti County): Sherburne County line northeast of Zimmerman east via Isanti to Chisago County line west of North Branch. All signage removed by October 2016.

References

Google Street View photos, accessed June 2014

 
Inter-County Highways